Luis Toro (born 21 September 1925) is a Venezuelan cyclist. He competed in two events at the 1952 Summer Olympics.

References

External links
 

1925 births
Possibly living people
Venezuelan male cyclists
Olympic cyclists of Venezuela
Cyclists at the 1952 Summer Olympics
Place of birth missing (living people)
Pan American Games medalists in cycling
20th-century Venezuelan people
Medalists at the 1951 Pan American Games
Pan American Games bronze medalists for Venezuela